The Hamar men's football team, commonly known as Hamar, is the football department of Íþróttafélagið Hamar. It is located in the town of Hveragerði, just south-east of the capital Reykjavík. As of 2020, it plays in the 4. deild karla.

External links
 Official Website
 Hamar at Football Association of Iceland

Football clubs in Iceland
2006 establishments in Iceland
Íþróttafélagið Hamar

References